is a football stadium in Hiroshima, Hiroshima, Japan.

It hosted the 1957 Emperor's Cup and final game between Chudai Club and Toyo Industries was played there on May 6, 1957.

External links

Sports venues in Hiroshima
Football venues in Japan